The Innovate Wrestling United States Tag Team Championship was originally a Tennessee version of the NWA United States Tag Team Championship.  It was a name used for several championships from 1958 - 2000 in various promotions that were members of the National Wrestling Alliance (NWA). On January 24, 2014, a new NWA United States Tag Team Championship was created as part of the NWA Southern All-Star Wrestling and NWA Smoky Mountain Wrestling promotions.  On August 19 at ReGenesis, promoter Tony Givens announced that NWA Smoky Mountain Wrestling was leaving the NWA thus the promotion was changing their name to Innovate Wrestling.  The titles were retired and replaced with the Innovate Wrestling United States Tag Team Championship.

Title history
Key

Combined reigns

By team

By wrestler

See also
National Wrestling Alliance
NWA Smoky Mountain Wrestling
NWA Southern All-Star Wrestling
List of National Wrestling Alliance championships
Innovate Wrestling United States Tag Team Championship

References

External links
Official Website of the National Wrestling Alliance
NWA Smoky Mountain Wrestling
NWA United States Tag Team Title History - wrestling-titles.com

National Wrestling Alliance championships
Tag team wrestling championships
Professional wrestling in Tennessee
United States professional wrestling championships